The Bugge Islands are a small group of ice-covered islands lying close off the front of Wordie Ice Shelf and between  northwest of Mount Guernsey, off the west coast of the Antarctic Peninsula. They were first seen from the air and photographed by the British Graham Land Expedition in 1936, and later roughly mapped from the photographs. They were observed in 1947 from the Port of Beaumont, Texas by the Ronne Antarctic Research Expedition (RARE) under Finn Ronne, who named these islands for his niece, Ruth Bugge, who supplied woolen clothing from Norway for the RARE. The group was also visited by the Chilean Antarctic Expedition, 1947, which named the islands Isla Aldea, Isla Eleuterio Ramírez, Isla Latorre, after heroes of the naval battle of Iquique.

From North to South the islands of the group are:
Ramírez Island 
Aldea Island 
Landrum Island

See also 
 List of Antarctic and sub-Antarctic islands

References 

Islands of Graham Land
Fallières Coast